Federal Highway 12 (Fed. 12) is a free part of the federal highways corridors of Mexico. Fed. 12 is set from Fed. 1 in central Baja California to Bahía de los Ángeles and its total length is 68 km (42.25 mi).

References

012